Majida Margarita Issa Bellotto (born in San Andrés, Colombia on June 27, 1981), known professionally as Majida Issa, is a Colombian actress and singer of Italian and Lebanese descent. She is best known for her role as Yésica Beltrán (La Diabla) in Telemundo's telenovela Sin senos sí hay paraíso (2016–2018), based on the book by Gustavo Bolívar, titled Sin tetas no hay paraíso.

Early life and education
Issa studied acting in Escuela Nacional de Arte Teatral in Mexico.

She is the granddaughter of Teresa Gutiérrez and the niece of Miguel Varoni.

She is of Italian and Lebanese descent.

Personal life 
In 2010, she married Mijail Mulkay. The couple later divorced in 2012.

She has a sister named Jordana Issa, who also acted in El Clon, a Spanish-language telenovela produced by the U.S.-based television network Telemundo and the Brazilian network Globo.

Filmography

References

External links 
 

Colombian telenovela actresses
Colombian television actresses
Colombian people of Italian descent
Colombian people of Lebanese descent
21st-century Colombian actresses
1981 births
Living people
Colombian people of Argentine descent